Gianfranco Leoncini (25 September 1939 – 5 April 2019) was an Italian footballer who played as a midfielder.

Club career
During his club career, Leoncini played for Juventus, Atalanta and Mantova. He won three Serie A titles with Juventus.

International career
At international level, Leoncini earned 2 caps for the Italy national football team in 1966, and participated in the 1966 FIFA World Cup.

Honours
Juventus
Coppa Italia: 1958–59, 1959–60, 1964–65
Serie A: 1959–60, 1960–61, 1966–67

References

External links
Profile at Enciclopediadelcalcio.it

1939 births
2019 deaths
Italian footballers
Italy international footballers
1966 FIFA World Cup players
Juventus F.C. players
Atalanta B.C. players
Mantova 1911 players
Serie A players
Serie B players
Italian football managers
Atalanta B.C. managers
Association football midfielders